The Kearney and Black Hills Railway was a short line railroad built in the late 19th century between Kearney and Callaway, Nebraska.  It was purchased by the Union Pacific Railroad in 1898.

References

Defunct Nebraska railroads
Predecessors of the Union Pacific Railroad
Railway companies established in 1889
Railway companies disestablished in 1898
1889 establishments in Nebraska